The Association for Computing Machinery's Special Interest Group on Computer Science Education (SIGCSE) Technical Symposium is the main ACM conference for computer science educators. It has been held annually in February or March in the United States since 1970, with the exception of 2020 when it was cancelled due to COVID-19. In 2019, there were 1,809 attendees and 994 total submissions from over 50 countries, with a total of 2,668 unique authors representing over 800 institutions and organizations. There were 526 paper submissions (up 15% on 2018), with 169 papers accepted across the three paper tracks (CS Education Research, Experience Reports & Tools, and Curricula Initiatives) which was up 5% over 2018. It is a CORE A Conference.

SIGCSE members often refer to the Symposium as "SIGCSE" (pronounced SIG-see), as in "Are you going to SIGCSE this year?" or "I attended her talk at last year's SIGCSE". Thus, while "SIGCSE" refers to the ACM Special Interest Group (SIG) that is SIGCSE, it also refers to the SIGCSE Technical Symposium.

Conferences
Susan Rodger maintains a page with the history of the SIGCSE Technical Symposium and other SIGCSE conferences.

SIGCSE 2022 - Providence, Rhode Island - March 2–5, 2022 - 53rd conference
SIGCSE 2021 Toronto, Canada (virtual due to COVID-19 pandemic) - March 13–20, 2021 
SIGCSE 2020 Portland, Oregon - March 11–14, 2020 - 51st conference
SIGCSE 2019 Minneapolis, Minnesota - February 27 - March 2, 2019 - 50th conference
SIGCSE 2018 Baltimore, Maryland - February 21–24, 2018 - 49th conference
SIGCSE 2017 Seattle, Washington - March 8–11, 2017 - 48th conference
SIGCSE 2016 Memphis, Tennessee - March 2–5, 2016 - 47th conference
SIGCSE 2015 Kansas City, Missouri - March 4–7, 2015 - 46th conference
SIGCSE 2014 Atlanta, Georgia - March 5–8, 2014 - 45th conference
 SIGCSE 2013 - Denver, Colorado - 44th conference
 SIGCSE 2012 - Raleigh, NC - 43rd conference
 SIGCSE 2011 - Dallas, Texas - 42nd conference
 SIGCSE 2010 - Milwaukee, Wisconsin - 41st conference
 SIGCSE 2009 - Chattanooga, Tennessee - 40th conference
 SIGCSE 2008 - Portland, Oregon - 39th conference
 SIGCSE 2007 - Covington, Kentucky - 38th conference
 SIGCSE 2006 - Houston, Texas - 37th conference

Nifty Assignments
The Nifty Assignments session is one of the most popular sessions at the conference. Started by Nick Parlante in 1999, the session serves as a place for educators to share ideas and materials for successful computer science assignments. Nifty assignments are shared publicly for general reference and usage.

Presenters have included Owen Astrachan, Allison Obourne, Richard E. Pattis, Suzanne Matthews, Joseph Zachary, Eric S. Roberts, Cay Horstmann, Michelle Craig, Mehran Sahami, David Malan, and Mark Guzdial.

References

External links
 Nifty Assignments
SIGCSE Technical Symposium

Computer conferences
Computer science education
Association for Computing Machinery conferences